Carlos Roberto Pérez Loarca (born July 12, 1968) is a Mexican football manager and former player. He was born in Querétaro City, Querétaro.

External links

1968 births
Living people
Mexican footballers
Mexican football managers
Association football goalkeepers
Cruz Azul footballers
Liga MX players
Footballers from Querétaro
Sportspeople from Querétaro City